Arates is an abandoned village in the Yeghegis Municipality of the Vayots Dzor Province of Armenia.

References

External links 
 

Former populated places in Vayots Dzor Province